In R v Schoonwinkel, an important case in South African criminal law, particularly as it applies to the defence of automatism, the driver of a motor vehicle was charged with culpable homicide, having collided with and killed a passenger in another car. The accused had had an epileptic seizure at the time of the accident, rendering his mind a blank. The nature of his epilepsy was such that he would normally not have realised or foreseen the dangers of driving, having had only two previous minor attacks, the last a long time before the accident. This evidence, distinguishing this case from R v Victor, exonerated him from criminal responsibility. The court found additionally that this was not a case falling under the provisions of the Mental Disorders Act, read with section 219 of the Criminal Procedure Act.

See also 
 Automatism (law)
 R v Victor 1943 TPD 77
 South African criminal law

References 
 R v Schoonwinkel 1953 (3) SA 136 (C).

Notes 

1953 in South African law
1953 in case law
South African criminal case law
Western Cape Division cases
Epilepsy